Steven Kazor (born 1948) is an American football executive, scout, and former coach who is the general manager for the Michigan Panthers of the United States Football League (USFL). Kazor served as the head football coach at Iowa Wesleyan College (1993), McPherson College (1998–1999), and Wayne State University (2000–2003), compiling a career college football record of 33–40. He was assistant coach in the NFL with the Chicago Bears from 1982 to 1992 and the Detroit Lions from 1994 to 1996. Working under head coach Mike Ditka, Kazor was a member of the coaching staff for the 1985 Chicago Bears, champions of Super Bowl XX.

Early life and playing career
Kazor was born in 1948 in New Kensington, Pennsylvania. A native of Pittsburgh, Pennsylvania, he graduated from Rancho High School in North Las Vegas, Nevada. He attended Westminster College in Salt Lake City, Utah, where he lettered for four years on the football team, playing as a nose tackle, and was tri-captain in his senior year.

Coaching career
After graduating from Westminster College, Kazor coached at Camden Military Academy in Camden, South Carolina. In 1973, he was named head football coach at the College of Emporia in Emporia, Kansas, but the school was closed in 1974. Kazor spent the 1974 season at the University of Texas at Arlington as an assistant coach. The following year he was hired as defensive line coach at Colorado State University. After working for a year at Colorado State under head coach Sark Arslanian, Kazor was hired in 1976 as the defensive coordinator at Southern Utah State College—now known as Southern Utah University—under head coach Tom Kingsford. In 1977, he moved to the University of Texas at Austin as an aide to head coach Fred Akers.

Kazor was the linebackers coach at the University of Texas at El Paso (UTEP) in 1979 and 1980 under head coach Bill Michael before moving to the National Football League (NFL) in 1981 to work as a scout for the Dallas Cowboys. In 1982, he was hired as the special teams coach for the NFL's Chicago Bears by newly appointed head coach Mike Ditka.

After 11 seasons with the Bears, Kazor returned to the college football ranks, in 1993, when he was hired as the head football coach at Iowa Wesleyan College—now known as Iowa Wesleyan University. Kazor was the head football coach at McPherson College in McPherson, Kansas for the 1998 and 1999 seasons. His coaching record at McPherson was 12–8. In February 2000, Kazor was named the head football coach at Wayne State University in Detroit, Michigan.

Head coaching record

College

References

1948 births
Living people
American football defensive linemen
Chicago Bears coaches
College of Emporia Fighting Presbies football coaches
Colorado State Rams football coaches
Dallas Cowboys scouts
Detroit Lions coaches
Iowa Wesleyan Tigers football coaches
McPherson Bulldogs football coaches
Ottawa Renegades coaches
Southern Utah Thunderbirds football coaches
St. Louis Rams scouts
Texas Longhorns football coaches
Texas–Arlington Mavericks football coaches
UTEP Miners football coaches
Wayne State Warriors football coaches
Westminster Parsons football coaches
Westminster Parsons football players
High school baseball coaches in the United States
High school football coaches in South Carolina
Junior college football coaches in the United States
People from North Las Vegas, Nevada
People from New Kensington, Pennsylvania
Coaches of American football from Nevada
Players of American football from Nevada
Players of American football from Pittsburgh